José Manuel Gomes Andrade was previously a member of the Pan-African Parliament from Cape Verde. As of 2015 he is serving as a member of Cape Verde's national assembly.

References

Year of birth missing (living people)
Living people
Members of the Pan-African Parliament from Cape Verde
Cape Verdean politicians